Half a Sixpence (also Kipps - The New Half A Sixpence Musical) is a stage musical based on the 1905 novel Kipps by H. G. Wells and the original 1963 musical, with music by George Stiles and Anthony Drewe, and lyrics by Anthony Drewe and Heneker, featuring several of the original songs by Heneker, and book by Julian Fellowes.

Background 
The original musical of Half a Sixpence, based on the novel Kipps by H. G. Wells, featured music and lyrics by David Heneker and book by Beverley Cross. The musical was written as a star vehicle for British pop star Tommy Steele who performed the role of Kipps originally in London in 1963, Broadway in 1965 and in the 1967 film adaptation. It was evident that the show relied on Steele as the star vehicle as he featured in twelve of the musical's fifteen songs.

Following the success with Mary Poppins, producer Cameron Mackintosh reunited the same team of George Stiles and Anthony Drewe to adapt Heneker's original songs and create new material for the production, with Julian Fellowes writing an entirely new book. The creative team also reunites Stiles and Drewe with Fellowes after Mary Poppins and the new musical adaptation of The Wind in the Willows (which also reunites director Rachel Kavanaugh, who also directed Stiles and Drewe's Peter Pan: A Musical Adventure).

Production history

Chichester and West End production (2016-17) 
The musical premiered at Chichester Festival Theatre from 14 July to 2 September 2016 as a co-production with Cameron Mackintosh. It was originally announced that Bryan Dick would star as Kipps, however he later withdrew to appear in the West End production of Hobson's Choice. It was later announced that newcomer Charlie Stemp would take over as Arthur Kipps alongside Devon-Elise Johnson as Ann Pornick, Ian Bartholomew as Chitterlow, Emma Williams as Helen Walsingham and Vivien Parry as Mrs Walsingham. The production is directed by Rachel Kavanaugh, designed by Paul Brown, choreographed by Andrew Wright, orchestrations by William David Brohn, lighting by Paule Constable, sound by Mick Potter and video design by Luke Halls.

Following rave reviews in Chichester, the production transferred to the West End in London at the Noël Coward Theatre with previews beginning 29 October and press night on 17 November 2016. It featured the original Chichester cast and ran for ten months in the West End following three extensions to its limited run. Combined with the Chichester run, the production played around 400 performances.

Amateur productions 

The Amateur World Premier was performed by Manchester Musical Youth, at Zion Arts in Hulme, Manchester, in 2018

The cast included Harry Warburton as Arthur Kipps, Beth Kevern as Ann Pornick, Emma Wilcox as Helen Walsingham, and Mia Inglott as Flo. Warburton won a NODA award for his performance as Kipps

Characters and cast

Musical numbers 

 Act I
 "Half a Sixpence" - Arthur Kipps and Ann Pornick
 "Look Alive" - Company
 "Money to Burn" - Arthur Kipps, Mr Shalford, Sid Pornick, Buggins, Pierce and Flo
 "Believe in Yourself" - Arthur Kipps and Helen Walsingham
 "She's Too Far Above Me" - Arthur Kipps
 "Money to Burn" (Reprise) - Arthur Kipps and Chitterlow
 "A Proper Gentleman" - Arthur Kipps, Sid Pornick, Buggins, Pearce and Flo
 "Half a Sixpence" (Reprise) - Arthur Kipps and Ann Pornick
 "Long Ago" - Ann Pornick
 "The Joy of the Theatre" - Chitterlow and Company
 "Just a Few Little Things" - Helen Walsingham and Arthur Kipps
 "A Little Touch of Happiness" - Ann Pornick and Flo
 "If The Rain's Got to Fall" - Mrs Walsingham, Arthur Kipps, Foster, Helen Walsingham, Lady Punnet and Company

 Act II
 "The One That's Run Away" - Chitterlow & Arthur Kipps
 "Pick Out a Simple Tune" - Arthur Kipps and Ann Pornick
 "You Never Get Anything Right / I Know Who I Am" - Arthur Kipps and Ann Pornick
 "We'll Build a Palace / I Only Want a Little House" - Arthur Kipps, Helen Walsingham, Mrs Walsingham, James Walsingham
 "In the Middle There's Me" - Arthur Kipps, Buggins, Sid Pornick and Pierce
 "Long Ago" (Reprise) - Arthur Kipps and Ann Pornick
 "Flash Bang Wallop" - Arthur Kipps, Ann Pornick, Mr. Shalford, Pearce, Sid Pornick, Buggins, Flo, Photographer and Company
 "Flash Bang Wallop" (Reprise)- Chitterlow, Arthur Kipps, Ann Pornick, Mr. Shalford, Pearce, Sid Pornick, Buggins, Flo, Photographer and Company
 "Finale" - Company

Cast Recording 
On Friday 18 November 2016, the 2016 London Cast Recording was released by First Night Records on CD and iTunes digital download. It features 23 tracks and was recorded live during the final three performances in the Chichester run.

Home media 
A filmed recording of the 2016 West End production will be broadcast on Sky Arts on Wednesday 29 December 2021 under the title of Kipps (the musical's new licensing name).

Licensing 
The musical is licensed through Music Theatre International Europe to professional and amateur productions under the title Kipps - The New Half a Sixpence Musical.

Awards and nominations

London Production

References

External links 

Musicals based on novels
2016 musicals
West End musicals
British musicals
Musicals by Julian Fellowes
Adaptations of works by H. G. Wells